Hilliam is a surname. Notable people with the surname include:

Bentley Collingwood Hilliam (1890–1968), British singer-songwriter and musician
Sue Hilliam (born 1941), English cricketer

See also
William

English-language surnames